Alvechurch railway station serves the village of Alvechurch in North Worcestershire, England. The station, and all trains serving it, are operated by West Midlands Trains. The station itself is an unstaffed station.

Originally a single platform station on a single-track line, a second platform was added during 2014, when a new passing loop was constructed on the line through the station, in order to allow a more frequent service.

Services
As of December 2018, the station is served every 20 minutes by trains to Redditch Monday to Saturday, and every 30 minutes on Sundays. Northbound Monday to Saturday, there are trains every 20 minutes; one per hour to Four Oaks, one to Lichfield City and one to Lichfield Trent Valley. On Sundays, there are trains every half-hour to Lichfield Trent Valley. This increase follows the installation of a passing loop and second platform at the station in 2014.

History
Alvechurch station was built as part of the Redditch Railway and opened on 1 November 1859. It became part of the London, Midland and Scottish Railway during the 1923 railway grouping. Under the 1948 transport nationalisation it became part of the London Midland Region of British Railways.

Passenger services beyond Redditch ended in October 1962 and the line closed completely in July 1964 – the remainder of the route (including the station here) was threatened with closure following the publication of the Beeching Report in 1963 but subsequently reprieved (albeit with a much-reduced level of service – just four trains per day each way from the mid-1960s onwards) to serve the planned Redditch New town development announced in 1964.

As a result of the Transport Act 1968, from 1969 BR operated the passenger service on behalf of the newly created West Midlands Passenger Transport Executive. In 1982 BR divided its business into sectors, and Alvechurch came under its Regional Railways sector. Under the Privatisation of British Rail, Regional Railways was divided into several train operating companies. From 1997 Alvechurch became part of the Central Trains franchise. In 2007 the first franchise expired and was restructured. The new franchise was awarded to London Midland and ran until 2015, after which it passed to West Midlands Trains.

As a PTE station, Alvechurch has train services operated under the Network West Midlands names.

When the Cross-city line was upgraded and electrified in 1993 the platform at Alvechurch was re-sited slightly northwards. The new platform adjoins the old one end to end. The former station building is now privately owned.

2014 upgrade
Network Rail planned to increase capacity by adding a passing loop and second platform at Alvechurch. This was also to include a footbridge and lifts to reach the new platform. This was to allow the service to be increased from two to three trains per hour. The scheme was approved in November 2013.

The work to upgrade Alvechurch station began in November 2013. As of January 2014 the station was cleared and work began on building the new platform and footbridge.

In May 2014 the lift shaft on platform 2 was clearly visible from platform 1.

The section of line between Longbridge and Redditch was closed for 2 months from July 2014 to the end of August 2014 for the new track to be laid and overhead cables to be installed. It was reopened on 1 September 2014. The improved service began in December 2014.

References

Further reading

External links

Rail Around Birmingham and the West Midlands: Alvechurch railway station
 Station on navigable O.S. map

Railway stations in Worcestershire
DfT Category F1 stations
Former Midland Railway stations
Railway stations in Great Britain opened in 1859
Railway stations served by West Midlands Trains
1859 establishments in England